Walker Bay may refer to:

 Walker Bay
 Walker Bay, Livingston Island
 Walker Bay (Northwest Territories)